The Cúcuta metropolitan area is a Colombian metropolitan area located in the eastern section of the Norte de Santander department bordering with Venezuela. Its main city is Cúcuta. It is composed by the municipalities of Cúcuta, Los Patios, Villa del Rosario, San Cayetano, El Zulia and Puerto Santander.

It was created by the Decree # 000508 of 1991.

The Mayor of Cúcuta has authority over all the municipalities of this conurbation as the Metropolitan Mayor, although these territorial beings conserve their autonomy (mayorship, council, etc..).

See also
 Cúcuta
 Metropolitan Areas of Colombia
 Metropolitan Area
 Conurbation

References

External links

DANE - 2005 Census
Portafolio - Article about the Metropolitan Areas of Cúcuta

 
Cúcuta
Metropolitan areas of Colombia